Texas Monthly Talks was a thirty-minute interview show on public television networks across the state of Texas hosted by Evan Smith, then Editor Emeritus of Texas Monthly magazine. Produced by Dateline NBC veteran Lynn Boswell, the show addressed contemporary issues in Texas politics, business and culture. Premiering in February 2003, the show was an original production of KLRU-TV, the PBS station serving Austin and Central Texas. In 2010 the series was succeeded by Overheard, with the same format, host and producer; the renaming was necessary because Smith had resigned his position at the magazine and had become Editor in Chief of the Texas Tribune.

On Texas Monthly Talks Smith regularly interviewed public figures from Austin and around Texas, such as Bill Powers, the president of the University of Texas at Austin, mayors Bill White of Houston, Tom Leppert of Dallas, and Texas Governor Rick Perry. His guests also included notables in national politics, such as presidential candidates Howard Dean, John Kerry, Bill Bradley, John McCain, Joe Biden, Mike Huckabee, Bill Richardson, Hillary Clinton, and John Edwards; in business, such as Southwest Airlines co-founder Herb Kelleher and Whole Foods Market CEO John Mackey; in the media, such as New York Times columnists Maureen Dowd and Frank Rich and newscasters Jim Lehrer, Walter Cronkite, Dan Rather, Bob Schieffer, and Tom Brokaw; and in entertainment, such as directors Francis Ford Coppola, John Sayles, and David Lynch, singers Ted Nugent and Billy Gibbons, novelist Salman Rushdie, and actresses Lauren Bacall, Lily Tomlin, and Debra Winger.

In 2006 the show won a Lone Star Emmy Award for interview program. In 2009 an episode with Billy Bob Thornton won a Lone Star Emmy for arts or entertainment program.

Guests by season

Season eight
Mike Leach, head football coach of the Texas Tech University Red Raiders
E. J. Dionne, columnist and author
Francisco Cigarroa, Chancellor of the University of Texas System
Madeleine Albright, former U.S. Secretary of State
Buzz Aldrin, former astronaut
Taylor Branch, author
Gail Collins, New York Times columnist
Jane Smiley, novelist
Richard Linklater, director
Morley Safer, broadcast journalist
Michael Williams, Texas Railroad Commissioner and Republican candidate for the U.S. Senate
Augie Garrido, University of Texas baseball coach
Jon Meacham, editor of Newsweek
David Brancaccio, host of Now on PBS
Julian Castro, mayor of San Antonio
Mark Halperin and John Heilemann, authors
Tim Matheson, actor
Thomas Haden Church, actor
Jake Silverstein, author and editor of Texas Monthly
Cecile Richards, president of the Planned Parenthood Federation of America
Frank Deford, sportswriter
Arianna Huffington, founder of The Huffington Post
Anna Deavere Smith, actress and playwright
The Right Rev. Andrew C. Doyle, the Ninth Bishop of the Episcopal Diocese of Texas
Gwen Ifill, journalist
Sally Ride, astronaut

Season seven
Matthew McConaughey, actor
Lily Tomlin, comedian
Rick Noriega, state representative and 2008 Democratic nominee for U.S. Senate
John Cornyn, U.S. Senator from Texas
Boone Pickens, energy magnate
Rick Riordan, author
Susan Orlean, author
Roy Blount Jr., author
Mark McKinnon, Matthew Dowd, and Douglas Brinkley, pundits
Tom Kite, golfer
John Sharp, former Texas comptroller and Democratic candidate for the U.S. Senate
Jerry Patterson, Texas Land Commissioner
David Dewhurst, Lieutenant Governor of Texas
Joe Straus, Speaker of the Texas House of Representatives
Carl Hiaasen, author
Abraham Verghese, author
Bryan Burrough, author
Roy Spence, advertising executive
John Mendelsohn, president of M.D. Anderson Cancer Center
Billy Bob Thornton, actor
Mary Ellen Mark, photographer
Dee Dee Myers, former White House press secretary
Douglas Brinkley, author and historian
Sonny Rollins, musician
Jody Conradt, college basketball coach
Jeffrey Toobin, author and CNN commentator

Season six
Lance Armstrong, athlete
Tina Brown, author and editor
Robert Draper, author
Mark Halperin, ABC News political analyst
Clayton Williams, oilman and 1990 Republican gubernatorial candidate
Bill Richardson, Governor of New Mexico and 2008 Democratic presidential candidate
Ethan Hawke, actor
Carly Fiorina, former CEO and chairman of the board of Hewlett-Packard
Bill White, mayor of Houston
Carl Bernstein, author
Mike Huckabee, former Governor of Arkansas and 2008 Republican presidential candidate
Burton Tansky, president and CEO, The Neiman Marcus Group
Jim Lehrer, broadcast journalist
Francis Ford Coppola, director
Silvestre Reyes, U.S. Congressman from El Paso and Chair of the House Select Committee on Intelligence
Bud Shrake, novelist
John Sayles, director
Jeff Daniels, actor
Bob Dole, former U.S. Senator from Kansas and 1996 Republican presidential candidate
Tom Daschle, former U.S. Senator from South Dakota and former Senate Democratic leader
Hillary Clinton, U.S. Senator from New York and 2008 Democratic presidential candidate
Tom Leppert, mayor of Dallas
Elsa Murano, president of Texas A&M University
Debra Winger, actress
Billy Gibbons, musician
Don McLeroy, chairman of the State Board of Education
Lyle Lovett, musician

Season five
Mack Brown, head coach of the University of Texas Longhorns
James Baker, former secretary of state
Rick Perry, Governor of Texas
Chris Bell, Democratic gubernatorial candidate
Al Franken, radio personality and author
Carole Keeton Strayhorn, Independent gubernatorial candidate
Tom Brokaw, broadcast journalist
Kinky Friedman, Independent gubernatorial candidate
Gregory Curtis, author and former editor of Texas Monthly
Judith Ivey, actress
Dorothy Bush Koch, presidential kin/author
John Kerry, U.S. Senator from Massachusetts and 2004 Democratic party nominee for president
Lawrence Wright, author
Gore Vidal, author
Margaret Spellings, U.S. Secretary of Education
Pete Laney, former Speaker of the Texas House of Representatives
Steven Weinberg, Nobel Prize-winning physicist
David Lynch, director
Tom Vilsack, former governor of Iowa and 2008 Democratic presidential candidate
Ray Suarez, broadcast journalist
Tom Craddick, Speaker of the Texas House of Representatives
John Edwards, former U.S. Senator from North Carolina and 2008 Democratic presidential candidate
Calvin Trillin, author
Betty Buckley, actress
Ted Nugent,  musician
Bob Schieffer, broadcast journalist
Bill Bradley, former U.S. Senator from New Jersey
Christopher Hitchens, author
Michael Beschloss, historian
Norman Pearlstine, former editor in chief of Time Inc.

Season four
Dan Rather, broadcast journalist
Larry Faulkner, outgoing president of the University of Texas at Austin
Mark Halperin, head of ABC News Political Unit
Karen Olsson and Nate Blakeslee, authors/journalists
Bruce Babbitt, former governor of Arizona and 1988 Democratic presidential candidate
Wallace Jefferson, Chief Justice of the Texas Supreme Court
Greg Abbott, Attorney General of Texas
Maureen Dowd, columnist
John McCain, U.S. Senator from Arizona
John Cornyn, U.S. Senator from Texas
Ralph Neas, head of People for the American Way
Dick DeGuerin, attorney
Louis Sachar, novelist
Bill Powers, incoming president of the University of Texas at Austin
Ana Marie Cox, blogger
Frank Rich, columnist
Doris Kearns Goodwin, historian
Joe Biden, U.S. Senator from Delaware
Salman Rushdie, novelist
Elizabeth Crook, novelist
Walter Cronkite, broadcast journalist
Paul Begala, political strategist/broadcast journalist
Stephen Harrigan, novelist
Jack S. Blanton, philanthropist
Jane Fonda, actress
Kris Kristofferson, singer and actor
Karenna Gore Schiff, author
Dave Hickey, critic

Season three
Tom Craddick, Speaker of the Texas House of Representatives
Joel Osteen, preacher
Liz Carpenter, former presidential press secretary
Matthew Dowd, political strategist
Robert MacNeil, broadcast journalist
Kinky Friedman, 2006 candidate for Texas governor
John Shelby Spong, former Episcopal Bishop of Newark
Jack Valenti, former LBJ aide/former head of the Motion Picture Association of America
Lauren Bacall, actress
Billy Joe Shaver, singer
Al Franken, radio personality and author
Ruth Reichl, editor of Gourmet magazine
Anita Perry, first lady of Texas
Liz Smith, gossip columnist
Ronnie Earle, Travis County District Attorney
Linda Ellerbee, broadcast journalist
Isabel Allende, novelist
Joaquin Jackson, former Texas Ranger
William Broyles Jr., screenwriter
Jim Lehrer, broadcast journalist

Season two
Kay Bailey Hutchison, U.S. Senator from Texas
Ben Crenshaw, professional golfer
Ben Barnes, former speaker of the Texas House and former lieutenant governor of Texas
Mark Yudof, chancellor of the University of Texas System
Will Wynn, Mayor of Austin
Joe Jamail, attorney
Luci Baines Johnson and Lynda Johnson Robb, daughters of Lyndon B. Johnson
Gloria Feldt, then president of Planned Parenthood Federation of America
John Mackey, CEO of Whole Foods Market
Ralph Nader, activist and perennial presidential candidate
Darrell Royal, former head coach of the Texas Longhorns
Sarah Bird, novelist
Joaquin Castro and Julian Castro, state representative and councilmember from San Antonio, respectively
Anna Quindlen, columnist
Carole Keeton Strayhorn, Texas comptroller
Donald Evans, U.S. Commerce Secretary
Bruce Sterling, novelist
Julie Speed, artist
Jim Hightower, syndicated columnist
Bob Edwards, radio personality
Helen Thomas, White House reporter/columnist
Larry Flynt, pornographer
Harry Benson, photographer
Ray Benson, singer
Arianna Huffington, author/blogger
Kitty Kelley, biographer
P. J. O'Rourke, author/humorist
Kirbyjon Caldwell, preacher
Catherine Crier, author/broadcast journalist
Seymour Hersh, journalist
Oscar Casares, novelist
Peter Bogdanovich, director

Season one
Sherron Watkins, Enron whistleblower
Bill Bradley, former U.S. Senator from New Jersey
Anna Deavere Smith, playwright
Carole Keeton Strayhorn, Comptroller of Texas
Richard Holbrooke, diplomat
David Dewhurst, Lieutenant Governor of Texas
Robert Caro, historian
Mack Brown, head coach of the University of Texas Longhorns
Michael Dell, computer mogul
Shawn Colvin, singer
Gwen Ifill, host of Washington Week in Review
Howard Dean, 2004 presidential candidate
Kinky Friedman, singer and mystery writer
Sarah Weddington, attorney and pro-choice activist
Sidney Blumenthal, author and former aide to Bill Clinton
Henry Cisneros, former mayor of San Antonio and former HUD Secretary
The Flatlanders (Jimmie Dale Gilmore, Joe Ely, and Butch Hancock), singers
Pat Green, singer
Ann Richards, former governor of Texas
Laura Miller, Mayor of Dallas
Herb Kelleher, co-founder of Southwest Airlines
Tim McCanlies, director
Susan Combs, Agriculture Commissioner of Texas
Molly Ivins, syndicated columnist
Mark McKinnon, political strategist/media guru
Peter Marzio, director of the Museum of Fine Arts, Houston
Nellie Connally, former first lady of Texas
Jerry Hall, model and actress
Richard Linklater, director
Norman Lear, TV producer

References

External links
The official website of Texas Monthly Talks
Podcasts of select interviews
Texas Monthly magazine
Web page of Austin PBS station KLRU

Local news programming in the United States
2003 American television series debuts
2000s American television news shows
Texas culture